Semele (HWV 58) is a 'musical drama', originally presented "after the manner of an oratorio", in three parts by George Frideric Handel. Based on an existing opera libretto by William Congreve, the work is an opera in all but name but was first presented in concert form at Covent Garden theatre on 10 February 1744. The story comes from Ovid's Metamorphoses and concerns Semele, mother of Bacchus. Handel also referred to the work as 'The Story of Semele'. The work contains the famous aria "Where'er you walk".

The work fuses elements of opera, oratorio and classical drama. Semele was presented during Lent, one of Handel's regular oratorio seasons. However it was not what London audiences were expecting of an oratorio during the solemn season of Lent. Semele has a secular text with a story involving an adulterous sexual relationship. It is distinguished from Handel's operas by the large number of polyphonic choruses. Semele was performed four times during its original run, and twice again later the same year, but those were the only performances in Handel's lifetime. Today Semele is frequently fully staged and receives regular performances at many of the world's opera houses, as well as performances in concert form.

Background

Handel's last Italian opera, Deidamia, was performed in 1741. After this time, he concentrated on oratorio and musical dramas with English texts. Many of these, including Semele, were premiered at the Covent Garden Theatre, beginning with Alexander's Feast in 1736 and finishing with The Triumph of Time and Truth in 1757. As a result, in the early 1740s, oratorios at the Covent Garden Theatre were George Frideric Handel's chief activity. While most works had sacred or religious texts, two stand out for being secular: Hercules and Semele.

The libretto was written by William Congreve around 1705–6 and originally set to music in John Eccles's opera Semele. Handel's text was adapted by an unknown collaborator and he wrote the music in just over a month, from 3 June to 4 July 1743. Semele contains self-borrowings from Giulio Cesare and Fra pensieri qual pensiero (HWV 115), as well as borrowings from Alessandro Scarlatti (notably Il Pompeo), Porta, Reinhard Keiser and Telemann. Noteworthy in the score are the number and quality of accompanied recitatives (a characteristic it shares with Il Pompeo), and the sheer variety of style and tempo markings (23, with nine unique in English works).

The musical drama takes a similar shape to an opera, but Handel eyed a place for it on the Covent Garden Theatre's oratorio-centered Lenten season of public concerts the following February (1744). So he fashioned Semele for presentation in the manner of an oratorio – a wolf in sheep's clothing to those not already enlightened to Ovid's Metamorphoses. His ploy to bring a powerful story to the theatre met, perhaps predictably, with mixed reactions. Mary Delany called it a 'delightful piece of music', but commented, 'Semele has a strong party against it, viz. the fine ladies, petit maitres, and ignoramuses. All the opera people are enraged at Handel.' This probably related to the supporters of the rival Middlesex Opera Company, for whom Handel would not write. Harsh criticism is also known from Messiah-librettist Charles Jennens who recorded it was 'a baudy Opera'.

The questionable morals of whether Semele was 'profane' and so perhaps not suitable for decent members of the audience meant that the work quickly fell from the repertoire, only being revived once by Handel.

However, Semele remains a work of high quality. As Lord Harewood put it:
the music of Semele is so full of variety, the recitative so expressive, the orchestration so inventive, the characterization so apt, the general level of invention so high, the action so full of credible situation and incident—in a word, the piece as a whole is so suited to the operatic stage—that one can only suppose its neglect to have been due to an act of abnegation on the part of opera companies.

Performance history

Semele was first performed on 10 February 1744 at the Covent Garden Theatre, London, as part of a concert series held yearly during Lent. The audience naturally expected Bible-based subject matter. But the amorous topic of Semele, which is a creation of the late Restoration Period, transparently drew on Greek myths, and so it displeased those attending for a different kind of uplift. Being in English, Semele likewise irritated the supporters of true Italian opera, particularly as Handel would also not write for the rival Middlesex Opera Company. Winton Dean writes in his book Handel's Dramatic Oratorios:

The public [in 1744] found [Semele's] tone too close to that of the discredited Italian opera and set it down as an oratorio manqué; where they expected wholesome Lenten bread, they received a glittering stone dug from the ruins of Greek mythology.

As a result, only four performances took place. The cast at the première included Elisabeth Duparc ('La Francesina') in the title role, Esther Young as Juno (and Ino), and John Beard as Jupiter. Henry Reinhold sang the bass roles. Handel seems to have interchanged some of the music between singers.

Later, on 1 and 8 December 1744, Handel presented a revised version, this time at the King's Theatre, after cutting four sections of dialogue containing sexual innuendo and making additions that included interspersed arias in Italian (for the opera crowd) from Arminio and Giustino.

20th century

Semele fell into prolonged neglect until its first stage performances, in Cambridge, England, in 1925 and in London in 1954. These fueled an enthusiasm for the work that has not since lapsed.

Semele was staged on four occasions (1959, 1961, 1964 and 1975) by the Handel Opera Society under Charles Farncombe, and it entered the repertory of the Sadler's Wells Opera (now English National Opera) in 1970. The opera returned in 1982—after a 238-year hiatus—to Covent Garden (the Royal Opera House), with Valerie Masterson in the title role and conducted, as at Sadler's Wells, by Charles Mackerras.

The American stage première took place at the Ravinia Festival near Chicago in 1959. Semele was performed in Washington, DC, in 1980, and at Carnegie Hall, New York, in 1985, on the latter occasion with Kathleen Battle in the title role and John Nelson conducting. (A recording with a similar cast was made in 1990 and issued on the Deutsche Grammophon label.)

In 1999, Semele returned to the English National Opera in London in a highly regarded production by Robert Carsen. Rosemary Joshua played Semele, John Mark-Ainsley was Jupiter, Susan Bickley as Juno, and Sarah Connolly the sister Ino. The production was revived in 2004 with Carolyn Sampson (Semele), Ian Bostridge (Jupiter) and Patricia Bardon (Juno).

21st century

Pinchgut Opera staged a production in 2002 in the City Recital Hall, Sydney, conducted by Antony Walker and directed by Justin Way. There is a recording of this production.

In September of the same year a new staging by the Chinese artist Zhang Huan, conducted by Rousset, with Les Talens Lyriques, opened at La Monnaie in Brussels. This moved on 24 October 2010 to Beijing's Poly Theater as part of the Beijing Music Festival—the first major production of a baroque opera in the People's Republic of China. In May 2012 this production moved to the Canadian Opera Company, receiving generally poor reviews for having excised Handel's finale and haphazardly introducing Buddhist themes incongruently to the source material.

Among numerous performances worldwide, the piece received a production as a fully staged opera at Opera Philadelphia in 2019.

Roles

Synopsis

Precis:

Jupiter, king of the gods, takes the mortal Princess Semele to a secret hiding place on a mountain to be his mistress. When Jupiter's wife, Juno, hears of her husband's adultery she is enraged, and plots to ensure Semele's downfall. In disguise, Juno appeals to the girl's vanity and persuades her to insist on seeing her lover in his divine form. Jupiter reluctantly agrees but his thunderbolts burn and consume Semele. From her ashes, though, arise her unborn child by Jupiter—Bacchus, god of wine and ecstasy.

Act 1

Scene: Greece, in legendary antiquity

The scene is the temple of Juno. Near the altar is a golden image of the goddess

In the temple of Juno, Cadmus, King of Thebes, is preparing for the marriage of his daughter Semele to Athamas, Prince of Boeotia. Signs from the goddess indicate she approves of the match (accompanied recitative: "Behold! Auspicious flashes rise" and chorus: "Lucky omens bless our rites"). However, the bride has been inventing one excuse after the other to put off the wedding and her father and would-be bridegroom urge her to hesitate no longer (duet: "Daughter, hear! Hear and obey!"). To herself, Semele reflects on her dilemma—she does not wish to marry Prince Athamas as she is in love with Jove himself and calls on him to assist her (accompanied recitative: "Ah me! What refuge now is left me?", arioso: "O Jove! In pity teach me which to choose" and aria: "The morning lark"). Athamas, observing her, takes her physical signs of emotional upheaval as evidence she is in love with him (aria: "Hymen, haste, thy torch prepare"). Ino, Semele's sister, now appears, also in a state of distress as she is in love with Athamas (quartet: "Why dost thou thus untimely grieve?") Jupiter has heard Semele's prayer and his thunderbolts interrupt the proceedings and alarm the observers (chorus: "Avert these omens, all ye pow'rs"). The priests of Juno order the wedding abandoned and everyone to leave the temple (chorus: "Cease, cease your vows"), which all do except for Athamas, in despair at his wedding being cancelled, and Ino, hopelessly in love with him (aria: "Turn, hopeless lover"). Athamas can see she is upset, without guessing why, and he can feel for her in her distress because he is upset too (aria: "Your tuneful voice my tale would tell"). Athamas is astonished when she tells him bluntly that she loves him (duet: "You've undone me"). Cadmus interrupts their confusion and describes the extraordinary event he has just witnessed: as they fled the temple Semele was suddenly carried off by an eagle (accompanied recitative: "Wing'd with our fears"). The priests and augurs identify this eagle as Jupiter himself (chorus: "Hail Cadmus, hail!"). As the act ends, Semele is seen enjoying her role as the god's new mistress (aria: "Endless pleasure, endless love").

Act 2
Scene One

A pleasant country, the prospect terminated by a beautiful mountain adorn'd with woods and waterfalls. Juno and Iris descend in different machines. Juno in a chariot drawn by peacocks; Iris on a rainbow; they alight and meet.

Juno, suspicious of her husband's conduct, has sent her helper Iris to find out what she can. Iris reports that Jove has installed Semele as his mistress in a palace atop a mountain (aria: "There, from mortal cares retiring"). The outraged Juno swears to have revenge (accompanied recitative: "Awake, Saturnia, from thy lethargy!"). Iris warns her it will not be an easy task—the palace is guarded by dragons that never sleep (accompanied recitative: "With adamant the gates are barr'd"). Juno decides that she and Iris will pay a visit to the god of sleep in his cave, in order to get magical assistance to put the dragons to sleep (aria: "Hence, Iris, hence away").

Scene Two

An apartment in the palace of Semele. She is sleeping, Loves and Zephyrs waiting.

Semele awakes and regrets that the dream she was having of being with her lover has ended (aria: "O sleep, why dost thou leave me?"). When Jupiter enters, in the form of a young man, she tells him how difficult it is for her when he is absent. He explains that she is a mortal, unlike him, and needs to rest from their love-making from time to time. He attempts to assure her of his fidelity (aria: "Lay your doubts and fears aside"). Semele sings of her passionate love for him (aria: "With fond desiring"). The chorus of Loves and Zephyrs sing of lovers' joys (chorus: "How engaging, how endearing"). Semele, however, is beginning to be unhappy that her lover is a god and she a mere mortal. This sign of an ambition to immortality from Semele worries Jupiter who decides he must distract her from such thoughts (aria: "I must with speed amuse her"). The Loves and Zephyrs advise Semele to put aside worries and enjoy the delights of love while she can (chorus: "Now Love that everlasting boy invites"). Jupiter has arranged for Semele's sister Ino to be magically transported to the palace, to keep her company, and promises that the gardens and environs will be paradise (aria: "Where'er you walk"). He leaves, and Ino appears, describing the wondrous experience of being flown there by winged zephyrs (aria: "But hark, the heav'nly sphere turns round"). The sisters sing of the joy they are experiencing, hearing the music of the spheres (duet: "Prepare then, ye immortal choir") and nymphs and swains declare that this part of the earth has become a heaven (chorus: "Bless the glad earth").

Act 3
Scene One

The Cave of Sleep. The God of Sleep lying on his bed.

Juno and Iris arrive and wake Somnus (accompanied recitative: "Somnus, awake"), to his displeasure (aria: "Leave me, loathsome light"). He only gets out of bed when he hears Juno mention the beautiful nymph Pasithea (aria: "More sweet is that name"). Juno promises he will have the nymph if he will lend her magical aid to put the dragons that guard the palace where Semele is ensconced as her husband's mistress to sleep and transform her into the likeness of Semele's sister Ino. Somnus agrees (duet: "Obey my will").

Scene Two

An Apartment. Semele alone

Semele is still feeling rather unhappy about the discrepancy between herself and her lover (aria: "My racking thoughts"). Juno, in the form of Semele's sister Ino, enters and feigns astonishment at Semele's increased beauty. She exclaims that Semele must have become a goddess herself and gives her a mirror ("Behold in this mirror"). Semele is enraptured by her own beauty (aria: "Myself I shall adore"). "Ino" advises Semele to insist that Jupiter appear to her in his real, godlike form, and that will make her immortal herself (accompanied recitative: "Conjure him by his oath"). Semele is very grateful for this advice (aria: "Thus let my thanks be paid"). "Ino" leaves and Jupiter enters, eager to enjoy Semele (aria: "Come to my arms, my lovely fair") but she puts him off (aria: "I ever am granting"). He swears to give her whatever she desires (accompanied recitative: "By that tremendous flood, I swear") and she makes him promise to appear to her in his godlike form (accompanied recitative: "Then cast off this human shape"). He is alarmed and says that would harm her (aria: "Ah, take heed what you press"), but she insists he keep his oath (aria: "No, no, I'll take no less") and leaves. Jupiter knows this will mean her destruction and mourns her impending doom (accompanied recitative: "Ah, whither is she gone"). Juno triumphs in the success of her scheme (aria: "Above measure is the pleasure").

Scene Three

The scene discovers Semele under a canopy, leaning pensively, while a mournful symphony is playing. She looks up and sees Jupiter descending in a cloud; flashes of lightning issue from either side, and thunder is heard grumbling in the air.

Semele, granted her wish to see Jupiter in his true godlike form, is consumed by his thunderbolts, and as she dies she regrets her own foolishness and ambition (accompanied recitative: "Ah me! Too late I now repent"). Watching this, the priests of Juno express their amazement (chorus: "Oh, terror and astonishment!"). Athamas is now glad to accept Ino as his bride (aria: "Despair no more shall wound me"). The god Apollo descends on a cloud and announces that the unborn child of Semele and Jupiter will arise from her ashes (accompanied recitative: "Apollo comes, to relieve your care"). The child will be Bacchus, god of wine and ecstasy, a god "more mighty than love". All celebrate the fortunate outcome (chorus: "Happy, happy shall we be").

Musical features

The pleasure-loving and vain Semele is aptly characterised through Handel's music. The work contains one of Handel's most famous arias, the lyrical "Where'er you walk" for the tenor, with words from Alexander Pope's The Pastorals. Comedy is interwoven into the drama, notably in the scene in the cave of the god of sleep. The monumental chorus "O terror! and astonishment" after Semele's death shows the influence of the earlier English composer Henry Purcell.

Recordings

Audio recordings

Video recording

References

External links
 
 Score of Semele (ed. Friedrich Chrysander, Leipzig 1860)
Congreve's libretto for Semele hosted by Stanford University.
 "A rare Semele by Handel", by Donal Henahan in The New York Times, 25 February 1985, reviewing a performance in Carnegie Hall with Kathleen Battle, Marilyn Horne, Samuel Ramey; John Nelson conducting the Orchestra of St. Luke's

Oratorios by George Frideric Handel
Operas by George Frideric Handel
English-language operas
1743 operas
Operas
Operas based on Metamorphoses